The Ministry of Finance of Niger is a department of the Government of Niger in charge of public finances of Niger.

Ministers of Finance
Issa Diop, 1958
Barcourgné Courmo, 1958-1970
Mouddour Zakara, 1970-1974
Moussa Tondi, 1974-1983
Boukary Adji, 1983-1987
Mamadou Beïdari, 1987-1988
Wassalke Boukari, 1988-1991
Laoual Chaffani, 1991-1993
Abdallah Boureima, 1993-1994
Mohamed Moudy, 1994-1995
Almoustapha Soumaïla, 1995-1996
Amadou Boubacar Cissé, 1996
Jacques Nignon, 1996-1997
Ahmadou Mayaki, 1997
Idé Niandou, 1997-1999
Saïdou Sidibé, 1999-2000
Ali Badjo Gamatié, 2000-2002
Ali Lamine Zeine, 2002-2010
Mamane Malam Annou, 2010-2011
Ouhoumoudou Mahamadou, 2011-2012
Gilles Baillet, 2012-2015
Saïdou Sidibé, 2015-2016
Hassoumi Massoudou, 2016-2019
Mamadou Diop, 2019-2021
Source:
 Ahmat Jidoud, 2021-

See also
 Government of Niger
 Economy of Niger

References 

Finance
Niger
Economy of Niger
1958 establishments in Niger